Kim Dong-hyeon (born 24 September 1991) is a South Korean luger. He competed at the 2014 Winter Olympics

References

External links
 

1991 births
Living people
South Korean male lugers
Lugers at the 2014 Winter Olympics
Olympic lugers of South Korea